This is a list of Korean-language poets.

Twentieth-century poets

Alphabetical list

B
 Baek Seok (1912-1996)
 Bok Koh-il (born 1946)

C
 Chae Ho-ki (born 1957)
 Cheon Sang-byeong (1930-1993)
 Cheon Yang-hee (born 1942)
 Cheong Chi-yong (1902~1950)
 Cho Byung-hwa (1921-2003)
 Cho Chi-hun (1920-1968)
 Cho Chung-kwon (born 1949)
 Choi Jeong-rye (born 1955)
 Choi Nam-son (1890-1957)
 Choi Seung-ho (born 1954)
 Choi Young-mi (born 1961)
 Chu Yo-han (1900-1979)

D
 Do Jong-hwan (born 1954)

G
 Gi Hyeong-do (1960-1989)
 Go Hyeong-ryeol (born 1954)

H
  Ha Seung-moo  (born 1963)
 Heo Su-gyeong (born 1964)
 Hong Yun-suk (born 1925)
 Hwang In-suk (born 1958)
 Hwang Tong gyu (born 1938)
 Hwang Ji-U (born 1952)

J
 Jang Cheol-mun (born 1966)
 Jang Jeong-il (born 1962)
 Jang Seok Nam (1965)
 Jeong Ho-seung (born 1950)
 Jeong Ji-yong often romanized in literature as Cheong Chi-yong (정지용) (1902~1950)
 Jo Ki-chon (1913–1951)
 Jon Kyongnin (born 1962)

K
 Kang Eun-gyo (born 1945)
 Kim Chunsu (1922–2004)
 Kim Eon (born 1973)
 Kim Gi-taek (born 1957)
 Kim Gu-yong (Kim Kku; 1922–2001)
 Kim Haengsook (born 1970)
 Kim Hu-ran (born 1934)
 Kim Hyesoon (born 1955)
 Kim Jeong-hwan (born 1954)
 Kim Jong-chul (born 1947)
 Kim Jonghae (born 1941)
 Kim Jong-gil (born 1926)
 Kim Kyungrin (1918–2006)
 Kim Kwang-kyu (born 1941)
 Kim Kwang-lim (born 1929)
 Kim Kirim (1908-?)
 Kim Kyung-ju (born 1976)
 Kim Myeong-in (born 1946)
 Kim Myeong-sun (1896–1951)
 Kim Nam-jo (born 1927)
 Kim Nyeon-gyun (born 1942)
 Kim Sa-in (born 1956)
 Kim Sang-ok (1920–2004)
 Kim Sinyong (born 1945)
 Kim Seon-wu (born 1970)
 Kim Seung-hee (born 1952)
 Kim Soo-young (1921–1968)
 Kim Sowol (1902–1934)
 Kim Su-yeong (1921–1968)
 Kim Yeong-hyeon (born 1955)
 Kim Young-moo (1944–2001)
 Kim Youngtae (1936–2007)
 Kim Yeong-nang (1903–1950)
 Kwak Jae-gu (born 1954)
 Ko Chang-soo (born 1934)
 Ko Un (born 1933)
 Ko Hyeong-ryeol (born 1954)
 Ku Sang (1919–2004)

L
 Lee Hae-in (born 1945)
 Lee Hyeonggi (1933–2005)
 Lee Hye-gyeong (1960)
 Lee Jangwook (1968)
 Lee Seong-bok (1952)
 Lee SungBoo (1942–2012)
 Lee Yuksa (1904–1944)
 Lee Yuntaek (born 1952)
 Lee Ze-ha (born 1937)

M
 Ma Jonggi (born 1939)
 Manhae [pen name of Han Yong-un] (1879–1944)
 Moon Chung-hee (born 1947)
 Moh Yoon-sook (1910–1990)
 Moon Deoksu (born 1928)
 Moon Taejun (born 1970)

N
 Noh Cheonmyeong (1912-1957)

O
 Oh Kyu Won (1947–2007)
 Oh Sae-Young (born 1942)
 Oh Takbeon (born 1943)

P
 Pak Tu-jin (1916–1998)
 Park Hee-Jin (1931–2015)
 Park In-hwan (1926–1956)
 Park Jaesam (1933–1997)
 Park Jeong-dae (born 1965)
 Park Nam-su (1918–1994)
 Park Mok-wol (1916–1978)
 Ynhui Park (born 1930)
 Park Yong-rae (1925–1980)
 Park Young-geun (1958-2006)

R
 Ra Hee-Duk (born 1966)

S
 Seo Jeong-ju ("Midang") (1915–2000)
 Seung-Moo Ha (born 1964)
 Shin Kyeong-nim (born 1936)
 Shin Yong-Mok (born 1974)
 Sung Chan-gyeong (1930–2013)

W
 Wonhyo (617–686)

Y
 Yi Geun-hwa (born 1976)
 Yi Ho-woo (1912-1970)
 Yi Sang (1910–1937)
 Yi Sang-hwa (1901–1943)
 Yu Anjin (born 1941)
 Yu Chi-hwan (1908–1967)
 Yoo Yeong (1917-2002)
 Yun Dong-ju (1917–1945)

Chronological list

1970s
 Yi Geun-hwa (born 1976)
 Kim Kyung-ju (born 1976)
 Shin Yong-Mok (born 1974)
 Kim Eon (born 1973)
 Kim Seon-wu (born 1970)
 Moon Taejun (born 1970)
 Han Kang (born 1970)

1960s
 Lee Jangwook (born 1968)
 Ra Hee-Duk (born 1966)
 Jang Cheol-mun (born 1966)
 Park Jeong-dae (born 1965)
 Jang Seok Nam (born 1965)
 Seung-Moo Ha (born 1964)
 Heo Su-gyeong (born 1964)
 Ha Seung-moo (born 1963) 
 Jang Jeong-il (born 1962)
 Jon Kyongnin (born 1962)
 Choi Young-mi (born 1961)
 Gi Hyeong-do (1960-1989)
 Lee Hye-gyeong (born 1960)

1950s
 Hwang In-suk (1958)
 Park Young-geun (1958-2006)
 Kim Gi-taek (born 1957)
 Chae Ho-ki (born 1957)
 Kim Sa-in (born 1956)
 Kim Yeong-hyeon (born 1955)
 Choi Jeong-rye (born 1955)
 Do Jong-hwan (born 1954)
 Kim Jeong-hwan (born 1954)
 Kwak Jae-gu (born 1954)
 Go Hyeong-ryeol (born 1954)
 Lee Seong-bok (born 1952)
 Hwang Ji-U (born 1952)
 Kim Seung-hee (born 1952)
 Lee Yuntaek (born 1952)
 Jeong Ho-seung (born 1950)

1940s
 Cho Chung-kwon (born 1949)
 Park Hee-Jin (born 1947)
 Kim Jong-chul (born 1947)
 Moon Chung-hee (born 1947)
 Oh Kyu Won (born 1947)
 Bok Koh-il (born 1946)
 Kim Myeong-in (born 1946)
 Kim Sinyong (born 1945)
 Kang Eun-gyo (born 1945)
 Cheon Sang-byeong (born 1945)
 Kim Young-moo (1944-2001)
 Oh Takbeon (born 1943)
 Lee Garim (born 1943)
 Lee SungBoo (1942-2012)
 Choi Seung-ho (born 1942)
 Cheon Yang-hee (born 1942)
 Yu Anjin (born 1941)
 Kim Jonghae (born 1941)
 Kim Kwang-kyu (born 1941)

1930s
 Hwang Tong gyu (born 1938)
 Lee Ze-ha (born 1937)
 Shin Kyeong-nim (born 1936)
 Kim Hu-ran (born 1934)
 Ko Chang Soo (born 1934)
 Park Jaesam (born 1933)
 Ko Un (born 1933)
 Lee Hyeonggi (born 1933)
 Cheon Sang-byeong (1930-1993)
 Sung Chan-gyeong (1930-2013)
 Ynhui Park (born 1930)

1920s
 Kim Gwangrim (born 1929)
 Moon Deoksu (1928-2020)
 Kim Nam-Jo (born 1927)
 Park In-hwan (1926-1956)
 Kim Jong-Gil (1926-1956)
 Hong Yun-suk (1925-2015)
 Park Yong-rae (1925-1980)
 Kim Ch'un-su (1922-2004)
 Kim Kyu-yong (Kim Kku) (1922-2001)
 Kim Su-yŏng (1921-1968)
 Kim Sang-ok (1920-2004)
 Cho Chi-hun (1920-1968)

1910s
 Ku Sang (1919-2004)
 Park Nam-su (1919-1994)
 Kim Kyungrin (1918–2006)
 Yoo Yeong (1917-2002)
 Yun Dong-ju (1917–1945)
 Park Mok-wol (1916-1978)
 Sŏ Chŏng-ju (1915-2000)
 Baek Seok(1912~1996)
 Yi Ho-woo (1912-1970)
 Noh Cheonmyeong (1912-1957)
 Yi Sang (1910-1937)

1900s
 Kim Kirim (1908-?)
 Yu Chi-hwan (1908-1967)
 Lee Yuksa (1904-1944)
 Kim Yŏng-nang (1903-1950)
 Jeong Ji-yong, often romanized in literature as Cheong Chi-yong (정지용) (1902~1950)
 Kim Sowol (1902-1934)
 Yi Sang-hwa (1901~1943)
 Chu Yo-han (1900-1979)

1890s
 Kim Myeong-sun (1896-1951)
 Kim Ok (1896-unknown)
 Choi Nam-son (1890-1957)

Nineteenth-century poets 

 Han Yong-un [Manhae] (1879-1944)

Seventeenth-century poets 
 Yun Seondo (1587–1671)
 Heo Nanseolheon (1563–1589)

Earlier poets
Note: Some or all of these poets, though Korean, wrote in Chinese.

 Heo Nanseolheon (1563-1589)
 Seokcheon, pen name of Kim Gak (1536-1610)
 Hwang Jin-i (1522-1565)
 Song Deokbong (1521-1578)
 Yi Saek (1328-1395 [1396?])
 Ch'oe Ch'ung (984-1068)
 Kyun Yeo (917—973)
 Choe Chiwon (857-915)
 Wonhyo (617–686)

See also
 Korean poetry

References

Korean

Poets